Henriëtte Josephine Orri (5 June 1925 – 4 January 2022) was a Dutch actress.

Life and career
Born in Amsterdam, Orri studied at the Amsterdam Drama School, graduating in 1947. She mainly worked in theatre, as a member of numerous stage companies, and in 1986 was awarded a Theo d'Or for her performance in Arthur Kopit's Wings. She also appeared in films and television works.

Orri was married two times, the first with  Ton Lensink, with whom she had a daughter, Diane Lensink, who was also an actress and who died of cancer in 2012. She later remarried to the playwright and stage director Theo Kling, with whom she often collaborated. 

Orri officially retired in 1996, but nevertheless continued to appear on stage until 2006. She died in Amsterdam on 4 January 2022, at the age of 96.

Filmography

References

External links

 

1925 births
2022 deaths
Dutch film actresses
Dutch stage actresses
Dutch television actresses
People from Amsterdam
20th-century Dutch actresses